HD 130144 is a variable star in the northern constellation of Boötes. It has the variable star designation EK Boötis (or EK Boo), while HD 130144 is the designation from the Henry Draper Catalogue. The star is faintly visible to the naked eye with an apparent visual magnitude that ranges from 5.33 down to 5.71. Parallax measurements provide a distance estimate of approximately 810 light years from the Sun. It is drifting closer with a radial velocity of −23 km/s.

This is an aging red giant star with a stellar classification of M5III. It has an estimated 3.1 times the mass of the Sun and has expanded to around 210 times the Sun's radius. EK Boo is classified as a slow irregular variable that ranges in luminosity with an amplitude of 0.38 in magnitude and no apparent periodicity. This is an X-ray source, and was possibly the first M-type giant star to have a magnetic field directly detected.

HD 130144 has a high rotation rate for a star of this class, which may be the result of dredge-up of angular momentum from the interior, or else a merger with an orbiting companion. A long-term trend in the radial velocity data suggests this star has an orbiting companion. Most likely this is an active red dwarf that is responsible for most of the X-ray emission from the system. There is nearby visual companion at an angular separation of  along a position angle of 82.2° (as of 2010).

References

External links
 HR 5512
 Image HD 130144

M-type giants
Slow irregular variables
Red dwarfs
Binary stars
Boötes
Durchmusterung objects
130144
072208
5512
Boötis, EK